The barrier effect is the phenomenon by which roads, highways, or railways impede the natural movement of animals.

Barrier effect may also refer to:

 Barrier effect (climatology), the process by which mountains block the passage of rain-producing weather systems.
 Barrier effect (microbiology), the effect probiotic bacteria have to reduce the binding space for pathogens.
 Barrier effect (food technology), the objective of using coatings to prevent water migration between food layers.

See also